Tower Street is the name of:

 Great Tower Street, originally named "Tower Street", in the City of London
 Tower Street, Covent Garden, in London
 Tower Street (York), in England

See also
 Tower Street Adult Correctional Centre, a prison in Jamaica
 Tower Street GAA, a former sports club in Ireland